Tarik Black (born February 10, 1998) is an American football wide receiver who is a free agent. He played college football at Michigan and Texas.

Early years
Black attended Cheshire Academy in Cheshire, Connecticut. He was a four-star recruit ranked as the No. 81 high school player in the country by ESPN. He was also rated as the top recruit in Connecticut and was invited to play in the U.S. Army All-American Bowl.

Black received scholarship offers from Auburn and Alabama, among others.  In December 2016, in a Facebook live broadcast, he committed to play college football at the University of Michigan.

College career
Black enrolled early at Michigan in January 2017. He participated in Michigan's spring practice where he impressed observers.

On September 2, 2017, Black started at wide receiver as a true freshman in Michigan's season opener against Florida. He scored a touchdown on his first collegiate reception and had two receptions for 83 yards in the game. During the fourth quarter of the Wolverines' third game of the season against Air Force, Black was injured and left with a broken left foot. At the time of his injury, he led the team in receiving yards. He did not return for the rest of the season, finishing with 11 catches for 149 yards and one touchdown in three games.

Just before the start of his sophomore season in 2018, Black suffered another, similar injury, this time fracturing his right foot. He saw his first playing time of the year on November 3 against Penn State, and recorded his first catch of the year two weeks later against Indiana. He finished his sophomore season with just four catches for 35 yards and no touchdowns.

Black was healthy in the 2019 season, but had to compete for playing time with Nico Collins, Donovan Peoples-Jones and Ronnie Bell. For the year, he played in 11 games and had 25 receptions for 323 yards and 1 touchdown. Black entered the transfer portal on December 13, 2019.

On April 28, 2020, Black announced he had decided to grad transfer to the University of Texas at Austin.

Professional career

Indianapolis Colts
Black signed with the Indianapolis Colts as an undrafted free agent on May 6, 2021. He was waived on August 31, 2021 and re-signed to the practice squad the next day. He was released on November 23.

New York Jets
On December 7, 2021, Black was signed to the New York Jets practice squad. He was called up from the practice squad for the last game of the season against the Buffalo Bills and made his first career NFL catch. He signed a reserve/future contract with the Jets on January 10, 2022.

On August 30, 2022, Black was waived by the Jets and signed to the practice squad the next day. He was released on December 6.

Baltimore Ravens
On January 3, 2023, Black was signed to the Baltimore Ravens practice squad.

References

1998 births
Living people
Players of American football from Connecticut
Cheshire Academy alumni
American football wide receivers
Michigan Wolverines football players
Texas Longhorns football players
Indianapolis Colts players
New York Jets players
Baltimore Ravens players